The Michael Kay Show is a sports radio talk show airing on the New York City radio station WEPN-FM 98.7 ESPN New York. It is hosted by New York Yankees television play-by-play broadcaster Michael Kay, New York Rangers pre and post-game radio host Don La Greca, and WWE Network and Hot 97 radio host Peter Rosenberg. The show can also be heard on Sirius XM Radio channel 202. The show is also simulcast on television station the YES Network.

History
The show began airing on the radio in 2002, and on TV in 2014. On his radio show, Kay delves into a variety of topics related to current sports, especially those notable in the New York area. Kay also touches on non-sports topics in popular culture and public controversy on occasion.

On-air talent
Michael Kay
Don La Greca
Peter Rosenberg, Co-Host and Host of The Evening Nightly News (ENN)

Radio production staff
Andrew Gundling, Producer (2007-2022)
Anthony Pucik, Board Op

References

2002 radio programme debuts
ESPN Radio programs
Michael Kay
American sports radio programs
Radio programs on XM Satellite Radio
Simulcasts